Adem Koçak (born 1 September 1983) is a Turkish former footballer who played as a midfielder.

References

External links

1983 births
People from Yerköy
Living people
Turkish footballers
Turkey youth international footballers
Turkey under-21 international footballers
Turkey B international footballers
Association football midfielders
MKE Ankaragücü footballers
Trabzonspor footballers
Ankaraspor footballers
Bursaspor footballers
Sivasspor footballers
Bandırmaspor footballers
Sarıyer S.K. footballers
Süper Lig players
TFF First League players
TFF Second League players